Below is a list of awards presented by the Governor General of Canada on behalf of the Canadian monarch. The officeholder presents awards to recognize those people who have demonstrated excellence or exceptional dedication to service in ways that bring special credit to the country.

Awards
 Chief Scout's Award
 Commander-in-Chief Unit Commendation
 Excellence in Teaching Canadian History
 Governor General's Awards
 Jeanne Sauvé Fair Play Award
 John Hnatyshyn Award for Voluntarism in the Arts
 Michener Award
 Queen's Venturer Award

Former
 Bessborough Trophy
 Dufferin Medal

See also
 List of Canadian awards
 List of awards named after Governors General of Canada

References
 Governor General of Canada – Index of awards

Awards presented by the Governor general of Canada
Awards presented by the Governor general of Canada
Governor General of Canada